Porn to Rock is a various artists album released in 1999.

Track listing 

"Harder" (Sabateur featuring Chloe Nichole)
"Asshole Man" (Vinnie Spit featuring Mistress Jacqueline)
"Man on the Moon" (Madison)
"Who's Normal" (David Burrill)
"Screw My Head" (Marshall O Boy)
"Happy" (Johnny Toxic)
"Drink Beer and F***" (Nina Whett)
"5, 10, 15, 20" (Midori featuring Oran "Juice" Jones)
"The Meat Song" (Candye Kane)
"Little Red Riding Hood" (Geoffrey Karen Dior featuring Stacey Q)
"Fantasy World" (Ginger Lynn)
"Calypso Shower" (Suzi Suzuki)
"Strike Back" (Hyapatia Lee)

External links 

 site introducing the project
 site introducing the documentary about the project

1999 compilation albums